Terry Truax (June 10, 1945 – February 15, 2015) was an American basketball coach, best known for his tenure as head coach for Towson University from 1983 to 1997.

Truax played college basketball at Maryland before embarking on his coaching career. Truax was an assistant to Morgan Wootten at DeMatha Catholic High School in 1969–70. He held coaching staff roles at North Carolina, Virginia, Florida, Colorado and Mississippi State before being named head coach at Towson in 1983. Truax led the Tigers to a 202–203 record, highlighted by leading the Tigers to their first three NCAA tournament appearances from 1990 to 1992. He also coached at the high school and junior college levels and had stints in China and South Korea.

References

External links
Towson Athletic Hall of Fame profile

1945 births
2015 deaths
American expatriate basketball people in China
American expatriate basketball people in South Korea
American men's basketball players
Basketball coaches from Maryland
Basketball players from Maryland
College men's basketball head coaches in the United States
Colorado Buffaloes men's basketball coaches
Florida Gators men's basketball coaches
High school basketball coaches in the United States
Junior college men's basketball coaches in the United States
Maryland Terrapins men's basketball players
Mississippi State Bulldogs men's basketball coaches
People from Hancock, Maryland
Towson Tigers men's basketball coaches
Virginia Cavaliers men's basketball coaches